Gert Westphaler or The Loquacious Barber is a satirical play written by the Norwegian-Danish playwright Ludvig Holberg. It premiered in five sets at the Lille Grønnegade Theatre in Copenhagen on 28 October 1722 but Holberg later adapted it into a one- set version.

Reception
Holberg comments on the reception of the play in his first Latin-language memoir from 1728: The Loquacious Barber displeased almost all spectators in the audience to such an extent that quite a few left before it ended, some discretely and secretly, others openly and bluntly. I had expected something else, having always loved this eye-nest of mine among my comedies.

Adaptions
DR has produced a "made for television version" of the play that was first broadcast on 29 March 1976. It was directed by Hans Rosenquist and was starring Stig Hoffmeyer, Ruth Brejnholm, Lisbet Lipschitz]and  Ejnar Hans Jensen.

English translations

References

External links

  Gert Westphaler

Plays by Ludvig Holberg
1722 plays